2009 in esports

 
Esports by year